Goritsy is a rural locality (a village) in Chertkovskoye Rural Settlement, Selivanovsky District, Vladimir Oblast, Russia. The population was 47 as of 2010. There are 2 streets.

Geography 
Goritsy is located on the Tetrukh River, 26 km northeast of Krasnaya Gorbatka (the district's administrative centre) by road. Mokrovo is the nearest rural locality.

References 

Rural localities in Selivanovsky District